FWY may refer to:
 Five Ways railway station, in Birmingham, England
 Freeway
 FriendsWithYou, an American art collective